Giousouf is a surname. Notable people with the surname include:

 Aichan Kara Giousouf (born 1963), Greek politician
 Cemile Giousouf (born 1978), German-Greek politician